Colonel Sir Joseph Hewitt, 1st Baronet (14 October 1865 – 8 February 1923) was an English solicitor and coal mine owner.

Hewitt was born in humble circumstances, but qualified as a solicitor and later acquired substantial interests in the coal mining industry. He was an adviser to the Coal Controller during the First World War, and for these services he was knighted in 1919 and created a baronet in the 1921 New Year Honours.

He was commissioned into the 2nd Volunteer Battalion of the York and Lancaster Regiment in 1900. He resigned his commission as a captain in the 5th Battalion in 1910. In September 1914 he was given command of the Barnsley Battalion of the York and Lancaster Regiment (Barnsley Pals) as a lieutenant-colonel. He relinquished command and his commission in November 1915.

Footnotes

References
Obituary, The Times, 9 February 1923

1865 births
1923 deaths
English solicitors
English businesspeople
Knights Bachelor
Baronets in the Baronetage of the United Kingdom
York and Lancaster Regiment officers